During the 2008-09 football season, Dinamo will play its 58th Kategoria Superiore season in the club's existence.

Club

Management

|-
|}

Kit

|
|

|}

Other information

|}

Squad
As of August 31, 2008.

First team

List of 2008-09 transfers
as of 31 August 2008

In

Out

Player statistics

|-

|}

Competitions

Overall

Albanian Supercup

Kategoria Superiore

League table

Results summary

Results by round

Matches

Albanian Cup

First round

UEFA Champions League

First qualifying round

Player seasonal records
Competitive matches only. Numbers in brackets indicate appearances made. Updated to games played May 27, 2009.

Goalscorers

Goals conceded

Discipline

References

External links
KS Dinamo Tirana Official Website
Dinamo Tirana at Weltfussball.de

FK Dinamo Tirana seasons
Dinamo Tirana